Amédée Talaru  (born in Lyon; died in Lyon on 11 February 1444) was a 15th-century French pseudocardinal appointed by the Antipope, Felix V. He is a nephew of pseudo-Cardinal Jean Talaru who like Amédée Talaru had also been Bishop of Lyon. He was also Primate of Gaul.

Amédée Talaru was canon of Saint-Just church and canon, grand canon and archdeacon of St. John of Lyon. He attended the Council of Constance as a member of the Chapter of Lyons and the Council of Basel. Talaru was elected archbishop of Lyon in 1415 which made him Primate of Lyon, Rouen, Tours and Sens. The anti-pope Felix V created him cardinal in the consistory of 12 November 1440.

See also
Catholic Church in France

References

Year of birth unknown
1444 deaths
15th-century Roman Catholic archbishops in France
Archbishops of Lyon